Gopalpur is a village in Kangra district of Himachal Pradesh, India located near Palampur. There is also one branch school of the Tibetan Children's Village. Gopalpur is famous for Gopalpur zoo.

Places to visit

 Gurdwara Sant Baba Nand Singh ji - Tap Asthan (Cave, Gufa)
 Tibetan Children's Village
 Gopalpur zoo
 Tea Garden and Tea estate
 Power station
 Dorzong Monastery

Nearest tourist attraction
 Chamunda Temple
 Gyuto Monastery
 Norbulingka Institute

References

Villages in Kangra district